The Pan American Union Building is the headquarters for the Organization of American States. It is located at 17th Street N.W. between C Street N.W. and Constitution Avenue, Northwest, Washington, D.C.

History
On the former site of the John Peter Van Ness Mansion. The cornerstone was laid on May 11, 1908, by Theodore Roosevelt, Elihu Root, and Andrew Carnegie (who largely financed the building's construction), and the building was dedicated on April 26, 1910.

In 1919, the initial meeting of the International Labour Organization was held in the building.

Between 1921 and 1922, the building was used for committee and subcommittee hearings throughout the Washington Naval Conference while closely guarded by marines with fixed bayonets. 

The building was added to the National Register of Historic Places in 1969, and was designated a National Historic Landmark in 2021, for its architecture and its role in international diplomacy.

References

External links
 
 http://www.philadelphiabuildings.org/pab/app/ho_display.cfm/823231
 http://www.trumanlibrary.org/photographs/displayimage.php?pointer=1865&people=&listid=2
 https://www.loc.gov/pictures/item/90711000/

Buildings and structures completed in 1910
Government buildings on the National Register of Historic Places in Washington, D.C.
Organization of American States
Paul Philippe Cret buildings
National Historic Landmarks in Washington, D.C.